The 2011 TAC Cup season was the 20th season of the TAC Cup competition. Sandringham Dragons won their 2nd premiership title after defeating the Oakleigh Chargers in the grand final by 8 points.

Ladder

Grand Final

References

NAB League
Nab League